Khurram Shehzad (born 19 January 1982) is a Pakistani Domestic Cricketer. He Played domestic Cricket for various teams including Lahore Lions, Faisalabad, NBP, SNGPL and Lahore Eagles.

References

External links
 

1982 births
Living people
Cricketers from Faisalabad
Attock Group cricketers
Faisalabad Wolves cricketers